Stephan Medem (born 2 April 1960) is a former professional tennis player from Switzerland.

Career
Medem, the 1974 Swiss Junior Champion, played college tennis in the United States, for Tyler Junior College in the NJCAA. He was an All-American in 1984.

He took part in the main draw of the singles, men's doubles and mixed doubles at the 1986 French Open, but didn't make it past the first round in any of them. In the singles he was beaten in straight sets by Frenchman Jean-Philippe Fleurian.

Medem teamed up with Finland's Olli Rahnasto to reach the second round of the men's doubles at the 1988 Wimbledon Championships, with a five set opening round win. It would be Medem's only win at a Grand Slam tournament.

The Lucerne born player was most successful on the Challenger doubles circuit, reaching five finals and winning two of them, at Thessaloniki and Nairobi.

Challenger titles

Doubles: (2)

References

1960 births
Living people
Swiss male tennis players
Sportspeople from Lucerne
College men's tennis players in the United States